In the English winter of 1891–92, Lord Hawke led a touring party of English amateur cricketers on a tour of North America.  During their tour they played eight matches, six in the United States of America and two in Canada.  The tour contained two first-class fixtures, both contested against the Gentlemen of Philadelphia.

C.W. Alcock of Surrey originally intended to take the team, but finding himself unable to go had to find a successor. Lord Hawke took on the role of organising the tour. The team was weaker than he wished but the inclusion of Sammy Woods at the last hour considerably strengthed the bowling. Woods turned out to be the success of the tour, taking 76 wickets in the 8 matches at an average of 7, as well as scoring 260 runs.

Touring party

Matches

First-class matches
The party left Liverpool on 16 September 1891, and during the voyage Herbie Hewett, George Ricketts and Charles Wreford-Brown suffered badly from seasickness.  Sammy Woods, who was not affected by such ailments, attempted to get the three men to take dinner with him on the fourth evening.  He served champagne and vegetable soup, but an American who was also suffering from nausea commented "Say steward, did you bring this up or did I?"  None of Woods' three team-mates ate the dinner. The party landed in New York on the evening of 23 September and immediately made their way to Philadelphia for a half-day's practice before their first match.

Other tour matches

Match log

References

Bibliography

External links

1891 in American sports
1891 in Canadian sports
1891 in English cricket
1892 in American sports
1892 in Canadian sports
1892 in English cricket
Canadian cricket in the 19th century
English cricket tours of North America
International cricket competitions from 1888–89 to 1918
United States cricket in the 19th century
Cricket in Philadelphia